"I'll Be There" is the second single from English pop rock band The Escape Club's third album Dollars and Sex, released in 1991. It reached number 8 on the Hot 100.

Background

Singer Trevor Steel said,

Chart positions

Year-end charts

References

1991 songs
1991 singles
Song recordings produced by Peter Wolf (producer)
The Escape Club songs
Atlantic Records singles
Warner Music Group singles
Pop ballads